Torre de Cali ("Cali Tower") is a 44-story skyscraper in the northern part of Cali, Colombia. It lies with the Versalles district on the left bank of the Cali River. With 183 m it is the tallest building in Cali and among the tallest in Colombia. Due to its dominance of the Cali skyline it has become a landmark building of the city.

See also 
 List of tallest buildings in South America

References

Hotel buildings completed in 1984
Buildings and structures in Cali
Skyscrapers in Colombia
Landmarks in Colombia
Tourist attractions in Cali
Skyscraper hotels